Jorge Rivera Nieves (born January 22, 1951) is a Puerto Rican television news anchorman. He is an anchorman at Telemundo Puerto Rico's daily television news show, "Telenoticias".

Early life
Rivera Nieves was born in the San Juan suburb of Río Piedras, the son of Jorge Rivera, from the southern Puerto Rican city of San Germán and of Esperanza Nieves, from Yabucoa, a city in eastern Puerto Rico.

As a youth, Rivera Nieves enjoyed reading. He was elected class president during his ninth-grade year, and one of his teachers, named Eligio Armstrong, noticed Rivera Nieves had the ability to speak well in public, encouraging Rivera Nieves to try a career as a radio announcer. Rivera Nieves did his high school studies at the Escuela Superior Central in Santurce, another suburb of San Juan.

From 1968, when Rivera Nieves was in his late teens, until 1976, he worked as an announcer at WAPA-Radio, and he was soon also working at television's canal 4 as a show host, television journalist and announcer in a number of that television channel's shows.

In 1977, Junior Abrams, a sportscaster, informed Rivera Nieves that WKAQ-TV ("canal 2") was planning a news show. Both of them took auditions, and they were both hired.

Career at Telemundo
At Telemundo's television news show, "Telenoticias" (which was then known as "Telenoticias en Accion"), Rivera Nieves joined Abrams and Anibal Gonzalez Irizarry, Sylvia Gomez, Raul Quiñones (who had also been his newscast mate at canal 4 before) and others. In 1986, Rivera Nieves was upgraded to become one of the show's anchormen, a position he has since retained.

Honors
On June, 2022, Rivera Nieves was honored with two honorary degrees, by the Ana G. Méndez University and the Caribbean University.

Personal life
Rivera Nieves had two daughters with Lucy Davila Adorno. One of his daughters is Grenda 
Rivera Davila, who is herself a television journalist too. The other one is Monica Rivera Davila, a lawyer.

For years, Rivera Nieves has enjoyed a personal friendship with Pedro Rosa Nales of "Telenoticias"' rival show, WAPA-TV's "Noticentro 4", where Rivera Nieves used to work during the 1970s. For years also, he had a strong friendship with another television reporter, Efren Arroyo, to whom Rivera Nieves made a dedication after it was announced that Arroyo had died of COVID-19 in 2021.

The latter two joined Rivera Nieves in playing the Three Wise Men during a boat parade celebrating the 2013 holidays in San Juan.

See also
 List of Puerto Ricans
 Guillermo Jose Torres
 Rafael Bracero
 Pedro Rosa Nales
 Efren Arroyo
 Jennifer Wolff
 Luis Antonio Cosme
 Maria Falcon
 Anibal Gonzalez Irizarry
 Junior Abrams
 Luis Francisco Ojeda
 Avelino Muñoz Stevenson
 Keylla Hernandez
 Zugey Lamela
 Sylvia Gomez

References

Living people
1951 births
People from Río Piedras, Puerto Rico
Puerto Rican news anchors